Zarya (Dawn) was a Russian Marxist theoretical and political journal published in Stuttgart, Germany by the editors of Iskra  in 1901–1902. Four issues appeared.

References

Communist magazines
Defunct political magazines published in Germany
Magazines established in 1901
Magazines disestablished in 1902
Marxist magazines
Magazines published in Stuttgart
Publications of the Communist Party of the Soviet Union
Russian-language magazines